The 2011 ACC Championship Game was the seventh football championship game for the Atlantic Coast Conference. It featured the winners of the ACCs two divisions, the Atlantic Division and the Coastal Division. Clemson represented the Atlantic while the Coastal division was represented by Virginia Tech. This was the game's second year at Bank of America Stadium in Charlotte, North Carolina. It was Clemson's second appearance, and Virginia Tech's fifth, in the ACC Championship Game. Clemson defeated Virginia Tech by a score of 38–10, earning a spot in the 2012 Orange Bowl.  Clemson quarterback Tajh Boyd was named the game's most valuable player, after completing 20–29 passes for 240 yards and three touchdowns. He also ran for a touchdown.

Virginia Tech went on to play in the 2012 Sugar Bowl, where they were defeated 23–20 by Michigan.

References 

ACC Championship
ACC Championship Game
Clemson Tigers football games
Virginia Tech Hokies football games
December 2011 sports events in the United States
ACC